Man in a Shell is a 1939 Soviet drama film directed by Isidor Annensky. This film is based on the short story "The Man in the Case" written by Anton Chekhov in 1898.

Plot 
The film tells about the teacher of the Greek language Belikov, who works in a rural gymnasium. He is afraid of everything, prefers to store things in a shell and himself as if he lives in him, which strains the gymnasium and the people who live in the village. Suddenly the village visits Varvara, in which Belikov falls in love.

Starring 
 Nikolay Khmelyov as Belikov
 Mikhail Zharov as Mikhail Kovalenko
 Olga Androvskaya as Varvara Kovalenko
 Vladimir Gardin as School Principal
  as Superintendent
 Osip Abdulov as Tarantulov
 Aleksandr Larikov as Nevyrazimov
 Konstantin Adashevsky as Clergyman
 Aleksey Bondi as French Teacher
 Aleksey Gribov as Servant Afanasiy
 Nikandr Baronov as Doctor
 Faina Ranevskaya as Superintendent's Wife
 Sabina Lukovskaya as Nevyrazimov's Wife
 Oleg Lipkin as Pupil Neverov
 Pyotr Gofman as Flowers Vendor (uncredited)
 Aleksandra Matveeva as Flowers Vendor (uncredited)
 Ivan Pelttser as Guest (uncredited)

References

External links 

1939 films
1930s Russian-language films
Ukrainian-language films
Soviet drama films
Soviet black-and-white films
1939 drama films
Articles containing video clips
Films based on works by Anton Chekhov
Films based on short fiction